The Mississippi–Ohio Valley League was a Class-D American minor league baseball league. Evolving from the renamed Illinois State League (1947-1948), the Mississippi–Ohio Valley League operated for seven seasons, from 1949 through 1955. In 1956 the league was renamed the Midwest League, which still exists today.

History
In 1947, the Illinois State League was formed. Charter franchises were in the Illinois cities of Belleville, Centralia, Marion, Mattoon, Mount Vernon and West Frankfort. After the 1948 season, the Marion Indians moved out of Illinois to Kentucky. This necessitated a name change for the league.

The league changed names in 1949 to the Mississippi–Ohio Valley League. The league incorporated the new Paducah Chiefs and the five former Illinois State League teams, the Belleville Stags, Centralia Cubs, Mattoon Indians, Mount Vernon Kings, and West Frankfort Cardinals as 1949 charter members. 

In 1950, a Springfield, Illinois franchise left the Illinois–Indiana–Iowa League, the join the Mississippi–Ohio Valley League. The Mississippi–Ohio Valley League added expansion teams in the Paris Lakers and Vincennes Velvets. The Belleville franchise folded. There was more movement in 1951, as the Springfield Giants and West Frankfort Cardinals both folded and the Paducah Chiefs left to join the Kentucky–Illinois–Tennessee League. The league played 1951 with six teams, as Danville Dans joined from the Illinois–Indiana–Iowa League.

In 1952, the league again expanded to eight teams, adding the Commodores in Decatur, Illinois and Cardinals in Hannibal, Missouri, while Vincennes relocated to Canton, Ohio. In 1953, the Canton and Centralia franchises both folded and the league returned to six teams. There was expansion again in 1954, as two Iowa teams, the Clinton Pirates and Dubuque Packers returned the league to eight members. 

In the final season of the league, the Danville Dans moved to Kokomo, Indiana and became the Kokomo Giants and Mount Vernon moved to Lafayette, Indiana as the Lafayette Red Sox. Following the 1955 season, Hannibal moved to become the Michigan City White Caps, joining Kokomo, Lafayette, Clinton, Dubuque, Decatur, Mattoon and Paris in the renamed Midwest League. The Midwest League still exists today, with 16 teams.

Cities represented

Belleville, IL: Belleville Stags 1949, moved from Illinois State League 1947–1948 
Canton, IL: Canton Citizens 1952 
Centralia, IL: Centralia Cubs 1949, moved from Illinois State League 1947–1948; Centralia Sterlings 1950; Centralia Zeros 1951–1952 
Clinton, IA: Clinton Pirates 1954–1955, moved to Midwest League 1956–1959 
Danville, IL: Danville Dans 1951–1954 
Decatur, IL: Decatur Commies 1952–1955, moved to Midwest League 1956–1974 
Dubuque, IA: Dubuque Packers 1954–1955, moved to Midwest League 1956–1967 
Hannibal, MO: Hannibal Stags 1952; Hannibal Cardinals 1953–1954; Hannibal Citizens 1955 
Kokomo, IN: Kokomo Giants 1955
Lafayette, IN: Lafayette Chiefs 1955
Mattoon, IL: Mattoon Indians 1949–1954, moved from Illinois State League 1947–1948; Mattoon Phillies 1955, moved to Midwest League 1956 
Mount Vernon, IL: Mount Vernon Kings 1949–1954 
Paducah, KY: Paducah Chiefs 1949–1950, moved to Kitty League 1951–1955 
Paris, IL: Paris Lakers 1950–1955, moved to Midwest League 1956–1959 
Springfield, IL: Springfield Giants 1950 
Vincennes, IN: Vincennes Citizens 1950; Vincennes Velvets 1951–1952 
West Frankfort, IL: West Frankfort Cardinals 1949–1950, moved from Illinois State League 1947–1948

Standings & statistics
1949 Mississippi–Ohio Valley League
 Playoffs: Mattoon 3 games, Centralia 0; Paducah 3 games, West Frankfort 0; Finals: Paducah 4 games, Mattoon 3. 

1950 Mississippi–Ohio Valley League - schedule
 Playoffs: Centralia 3 games, Mattoon 1; Paducah 3 games, West Frankfort 0; Finals: Cancelled; Bad Weather & Military Call–up. 

 
1951 Mississippi–Ohio Valley League
 Playoffs: Mt. Vernon 2 games, Centralia 0. Danville 2 games, Paris 1. Finals: Danville 2 games, Mt. Vernon 0. 

1952 Mississippi–Ohio Valley League - schedule
 Vincennes moved to Canton June 7. Playoffs: Hannibal 3 games, Danville 1. Decatur 3 games, Paris 2. Finals: Decatur 3 games, Hannibal 1. 

 
1953 Mississippi–Ohio Valley League - schedule
 Playoffs: Decatur 3 games, Hannibal 0. Paris 3 games, Mattoon 0. Finals: Decatur 3 games, Paris 2. 

 
1954 Mississippi–Ohio Valley League - schedule
 Playoffs: Clinton 2 games, Decatur 0. Danville 2 games, Dubuque 1. . Finals: Danville 3 games, Clinton 1. 

1955 Mississippi–Ohio Valley League - schedule
 Playoffs: Dubuque 2 games, Clinton 0. Mattoon 2 games, Kokomo 0. . Finals: Dubuque 3 games, Mattoon 0. 

Hannibal folded and all other teams from the league became charter members of the new, Class D level Midwest League, now a Low Class A circuit, and the Mississippi–Ohio Valley League folded.

References

Further reading
Sumner, Benjamin Barrett.  Minor League Baseball Standings:All North American Leagues, Through 1999.  Jefferson, N.C.:McFarland. .

Defunct professional sports leagues in the United States
1949 establishments in the United States
Defunct minor baseball leagues in the United States
 
Baseball leagues in Illinois
Baseball leagues in Iowa
Baseball leagues in Indiana
Baseball leagues in Mississippi
Sports leagues established in 1949
1955 disestablishments in the United States
Sports leagues disestablished in 1955